Five to Go is an album by American jazz pianist Don Pullen recorded in Rome in 1975 and released on the Horo label.

Reception
The Allmusic review by Brian Olewnick awarded the album 3 stars stating "The two side-long pieces here, which appear to have been largely improvised, tend toward the more outside end of the spectrum... the finer moments of Five to Go make it a valuable document in this late musician's discography.

Track listing
All compositions by Don Pullen
 "Five to Go" - 24:40 
 "Four Move" - 21:10 
Recorded in Rome, Italy on July 29, 1975

Personnel
 Don Pullen – piano

References

1975 albums
Don Pullen albums
Horo Records albums
Solo piano jazz albums